Nipun Avinash Dharmadhikari (born in 1987) is a Marathi writer, actor, and director. He is known for the revival of Sangeet Natak(Musicals) and long five act plays.

Early life & personal life 
Dharmadhikari's early education was in a convent school. He started learning classical music when he was 8. His first contact with arts came when he did an impromptu performance of the Marathi play, Varhad Nighalay London La in front of his class, in school. The teachers found out and he then began performing for annual days and other public events. He was a student of Brihan Maharashtra College of Commerce, where he was studying to become a chartered accountant. In 2003, Dharmadhikari started acting in plays for Purushottam Karandak, Pune's intercollegiate theatre competition. He has also participated in Zee Karandak.

He is married to singer Sanhita Chandorkar.

Career 
He started Choke studio along with Priya Bapat, Amey Wagh, Parna Pethe and few students from brihan maharahtra college of commerce and Fergusson college in 2008, which produces Marathi plays. His maiden venture was the play Cycle, where he directed Amey Wagh. In 2009, he was seen in the Marathi film, Harishchandrachi Factory. He went on to direct two plays, the first one being Lose Control, which dealt with sexual fantasies of three teenagers; while the second one was Never Mind, starring Spruha Joshi. In 2013, Dharmadhikari also wrote for the Hindi romantic comedy-drama film, Nautanki Saala!.

In 2015, Dharmadhikari was also featured in Forbes India's 30 under 30 list. In the same year, he was also seen in Highway, where he was seen playing a football fan. He was again featured on Forbes Asia's 30 under 30 list in 2016. He hosts the satirical talk show Casting Couch with Amey & Nipun on the YouTube channel, Bharatiya Digital Party, which started the same year. He made his marathi movie directorial debut through Baapjanma(2017). He also went on to direct the national award winning film, Dhappa. He was the guest of honour at Vinodottam Karandak in 2017. He has also directed award winning plays like Sharam Gayi Toh, 36 and Dalan. In 2022, he directed the Marathi play Adlay Ka…?, starring Parna Pethe and Atul Pethe, based on the original work Die Besetzung (The Occupation) by Swiss writer Charles Lewinsky and translated by Shaunak Chandorkar.

Filmography

Films

Shows

Plays

Awards 
 Third Position at the Maharashtra State Professional Drama Competition 2017 (Direction), for Amar Photo Studio
 Best Director, Maharshtra Times Sanmaan 2017
 Nargis Dutt Award for Best Feature Film on National Integration in 2018 for Dhappa.
 Best Director, Zee Natya Gaurav Puraskar 2019 for Once More.

References

External links
 
Nipun Dharmadhikari Instagram

Male actors from Pune
Screenwriters from Maharashtra
Marathi screenwriters
Marathi actors
Marathi film directors
1988 births
Living people
21st-century Indian male actors
21st-century Indian film directors
Male actors in Hindi cinema
Male actors in Marathi theatre